Spelling-Goldberg Productions was an American television production company established on May 1, 1972 by Aaron Spelling and Screen Gems' top TV executive Leonard Goldberg. They produced series during the 1970s like Family, Starsky & Hutch, T. J. Hooker, S.W.A.T., Charlie's Angels, Fantasy Island, and Hart to Hart. Spelling's other companies, Aaron Spelling Productions (later known as Spelling Entertainment and Spelling Television) and Thomas-Spelling Productions, co-existed at the same time period and produced other well-known shows. A majority of the series produced by Spelling-Goldberg originally aired on ABC.

History
In 1973, Spelling-Goldberg struck a deal with Metromedia Producers Corporation to distribute the post-1973 output for off-net syndication, including TV movies and the new Chopper One. It was involved in a lawsuit with Worldvision Enterprises (previously ABC Films), the very first distributor of The Rookies; following the lawsuit, domestic syndication of The Rookies would be contracted out to Viacom Enterprises, which would distribute the program through the 1990s.

Spelling and Goldberg decided to part ways, and on June 27, 1977, the duo sold four of its series to Columbia Pictures Television including S.W.A.T., Starsky & Hutch, Charlie's Angels and Family. On May 17, 1982, the company was sold to Columbia Pictures for more than $40 million. Sony Pictures Television currently owns the Spelling-Goldberg television library (including the television series which were co-produced by Columbia Pictures Television). By May 1986, all of the Spelling-Goldberg's active operations went out of business after the last episode of T.J. Hooker aired.

In 2015, many of these series are now seen on Cozi TV.

List of programs

TV shows
All series today are owned and distributed by Sony Pictures Television. All series were previously distributed by Columbia Pictures Television and its successors (except for The Rookies, which was originally syndicated by Viacom Enterprises). Some programs were previously distributed outside the United States through Metromedia Producers Corporation and that company's successor, 20th Television.

 The Rookies (1972–1976)
 Chopper One (1974)
 S.W.A.T. (1975–1976)
 Starsky & Hutch (1975–1979)
 Charlie's Angels (1976–1981)
 Family (1976–1980)
 Fantasy Island (1977–1984, original series co-produced with Columbia Pictures Television)
 Hart to Hart (1979–1984)
 T. J. Hooker (1982–1986)

Made for TV movies

For The ABC Movie of the Week
The Daughters of Joshua Cabe (1972)
No Place to Run (1972)
Say Goodbye, Maggie Cole (1972)
The Bounty Man (1972)
Home for the Holidays (1972)
A Cold Night's Death (1973)
Snatched (1973)
The Great American Beauty Contest (1973)
The Bait (1973)
The Letters (1973)
Satan's School for Girls (1973)
Hijack (1973)
Letters from Three Lovers (1973)
The Affair (1973)
The Girl Who Came Gift-Wrapped (1974)
The Death Squad (1974)
Cry Panic (1974)
Savages (1974)
Death Sentence (1974)
Hit Lady (1974)
Death Cruise (1974)
Only with Married Men (1974)
The Daughters of Joshua Cable Return (1975)

For The ABC [Insert Day] Night Movie
See The ABC Monday Night Movie and The ABC Sunday Night Movie
 Murder on Flight 502 (1975)
 The Legend of Valentino (1975)
 One of My Wives is Missing (1976)
 Charlie's Angels (1976)
 The New Daughters of Joshua Cabe (1976)
 Death at Love House (1976)
 33 Hours in the Life of God (1976)
 The Sad and Lonely Sundays (1976)
 The Boy in the Plastic Bubble (1976)
 Little Ladies of the Night (1977)
 Beach Patrol (1979)

Others 
 Stone (1973 failed pilot starring Robert Hooke)
 California Split (1974 theatrical film released by Columbia Pictures)
 Where's the Fire? (1975 comedy pilot)
 Baby Blue Marine (1976 theatrical film released by Columbia Pictures)

See also 
 Spelling Television
 Columbia Pictures Television
 Metromedia Producers Corporation

References

Bibliography
 Perry, Jeb H. (1991). Screen Gems: A History of Columbia Pictures Television from Cohn to Coke, 1948-1983. .

Television production companies of the United States
Sony Pictures Television